Costaclis egregia is a species of sea snail, a marine gastropod mollusc in the family Eulimidae.

Description 
The maximum recorded shell length is 13 mm.

Habitat 
Minimum recorded depth is 250 m. Maximum recorded depth is 1436 m.

References

External links

Eulimidae
Gastropods described in 1889